Directorate of Sports (ক্রীড়া পরিদপ্তর) is a government directorate responsible for sports in Bangladesh and is located in Dhaka, Bangladesh. It is under the Ministry of Youth and Sports.

History
Directorate of Sports is under the Ministry of Youth and Sports, along with National Sports Council and Bangladesh Krira Shikkha Protishtan, manage sports in Bangladesh. It owns a playground in Mohammadpur, Dhaka.

References

Government agencies of Bangladesh
1971 establishments in Bangladesh
Organisations based in Dhaka